Zhou Zhiruo is one of the two female lead characters in the wuxia novel The Heaven Sword and Dragon Saber by Jin Yong. Jin Yong describes Zhou Zhiruo's physical appearance as "beautiful, pure and free of worldly traits".

Role in the novel
Zhou Zhiruo is the daughter of a boatman from the Han River. Her name "Zhiruo" is derived from her birthplace, Zhijiang. Her mother died when she was very young. When she was 10, her father was killed by Yuan soldiers but she was saved by Zhang Sanfeng. She meets the young Zhang Wuji, who was travelling with Zhang Sanfeng, and they develop a friendship. Zhang Wuji leaves them later and follows Chang Yuchun to Butterfly Valley to seek treatment from Hu Qingniu. Zhang Sanfeng brings Zhou Zhiruo back to Wudang and recommends her to join the Emei School. She becomes an apprentice of Abbess Miejue, the leader of Emei.

Zhou Zhiruo meets Zhang Wuji several years later and falls in love with him. However, Miejue hates Zhang Wuji because of his affiliation with the "evil" Ming Cult. She forces Zhou Zhiruo to swear that she must not marry Zhang Wuji or have any romantic feelings for him. The oath is as follows:  Miejue names Zhou Zhiruo the new leader of Emei and tells her the secret behind the Heaven Reliant Sword and the Dragon Slaying Saber. She tells Zhou Zhiruo to extract the martial arts manuals and the Book of Wumu concealed in the weapons' blades and master those skills, and use them to glorify Emei. Zhou Zhiruo is unwilling to harm Zhang Wuji, but is bound by her oath to do so. On Divine Serpent Island, she steals the weapons and breaks them by clashing them together, obtaining the secret items hidden inside. She murders Yin Li and frames Zhao Min for the deed.

Zhou Zhiruo reads the Nine Yin Manual and masters a quick-learning and "unorthodox" version of the skills detailed in the manual. As the story progresses, she develops a closer relationship with Zhang Wuji, until she decides to break her oath and marry him. However, Zhao Min shows up and disrupts the wedding. Zhou Zhiruo attacks Zhao Min in anger but Zhang Wuji intervenes and stops her. Zhou Zhiruo feels that Zhang Wuji has betrayed her love, and begins to see him and Zhao Min as her sworn enemies. She pretends to marry Song Qingshu of the Wudang School, who has a crush on her, and passes him the Nine Yin Manual and tells him to learn the skills and use them to defeat Zhang Wuji.

During the Lion Slaying Ceremony held at Shaolin Monastery, Zhou Zhiruo defeats all martial artists who attended and emerges as champion of the wulin (martial artists' community). However, she eventually loses to the Yellow Dress Maiden, who uses an "orthodox" version of the skills in the Nine Yin Manual to overcome her "unorthodox" version. The Xuanming Elders attempt to steal the manual from Zhou Zhiruo after seeing how her martial arts have improved from learning it. They injure her with their Xuanming Divine Palm, but Zhang Wuji saves her and heals her with his Nine Yang Divine Skill, which inadvertently negates her "yin" inner energy and restores her back to her original state. Zhou Zhiruo feels guilty for her sins, especially when she encounters the "ghost" of Yin Li and admits to Zhang Wuji her past deeds and her love towards him. Towards the end of the story, Zhang Wuji tells her that he has decided that Zhao Min is his true love, making her give up on him. Zhou Zhiruo also discovers that Yin Li has survived her attack; Yin Li forgives her for trying to murder her. Zhou Zhiruo visits Zhang Wuji and Zhao Min in another version and makes some cheeky remarks when he is about to help Zhao Min paint her eyebrows.

Martial arts and skills
Zhou Zhiruo mastered a quick-learning and "unorthodox" version of the skills in the Nine Yin Manual, which include the Nine Yin Inner Energy, Nine Yin White Bone Claw, White Boa Whip Skill and Heart-Shattering Palm. Previously, she had also learnt the Emei School's skills, including Emei's version of the Nine Yang Divine Skill, Emei Swordplay, and Soft Palm of the Golden Peak.

In film and television
Notable actresses who have portrayed Zhou Zhiruo in films and television series include Candice Yu (1978), Angie Chiu (1978), Sheren Tang (1986), Gigi Lai (1993), Kathy Chow (1994), Charmaine Sheh (2000), Gao Yuanyuan (2003), Liu Jing (2009) and Zhu Xudan (2019).

Notes

References
  Tan, Xianmao (2005). Zhou Zhiruo: From a Compliant and Innocent Beauty to an Enigmatic Goddess of Vengeance. In Rankings of Jin Yong's Characters. Chinese Agricultural Press.

Fictional characters from Hunan
Fictional Han people
Fictional women soldiers and warriors
Fictional wushu practitioners
Fictional Yuan dynasty people
The Heaven Sword and Dragon Saber
Jin Yong characters
Literary characters introduced in 1961
Orphan characters in literature